Faithfull Forever is a studio album by British singer Marianne Faithfull. It was released only in the United States.

"Some Other Spring", "Lucky Girl" and "I'm the Sky" are unique to this album. The rest of the songs had been released as singles or would later be released on Love in a Mist, although the version of "Counting" is a different mix from its European release, and "The First Time Ever I Saw Your Face," with choral overdubs, differs significantly from the one on North Country Maid. Mike Leander was the arranger; Gus Dudgeon and Vic Smith were the engineers and Jean-Marie Perrier for the photography.

Track listing
 "Counting" (Bob Lind) - 2:52
 "Tomorrow's Calling" (Eric Woolfson) - 2:58
 "The First Time Ever I Saw Your Face" (Ewan MacColl) - 3:47
 "With You in Mind" (Jackie DeShannon) - 2:26
 "In the Night Time" (Donovan) - 3:05
 "Ne Me Quitte Pas" (Love theme from The Umbrellas of Cherbourg) (Jacques Demy, Michel Legrand) - 2:35
 "Monday, Monday" (John Phillips) - 3:07
 "Some Other Spring" (Arthur Herzog, Jr., Irene Kitchings) - 2:30
 "That's Right Baby" (Michael Farr) - 2:48
 "Lucky Girl" (Barry Mason, Les Reed) - 2:55
 "I'm the Sky" (Norma Tanega) - 2:30
 "I Have a Love" (Leonard Bernstein, Stephen Sondheim) - 2:50

References

1966 albums
Marianne Faithfull albums
Albums arranged by Mike Leander
London Records albums